Royal Air Force Ibsley or more simply RAF Ibsley is a former Royal Air Force station in Hampshire, England.

A perimeter track with three runways were laid out and 18 fighter pens allowing 46 fighters to stand in relative safety. 12 Blister and two Bellman hangars were built and ten dispersed accommodation sites were laid out to the north for the airmen & women. A double cupola Battle Head Quarters, two Control Towers (one small and one large)

History

Royal Air Force

The airfield was initially used by No. 32 Squadron RAF with Hawker Hurricanes, followed by No. 118 Squadron RAF with Supermarine Spitfires.

In 1941 it was used as a location for the film The First of the Few.

The following units were here at some point:

Ibsley was also used, for short periods, in 1942 and 1944, by the United States Army Air Forces

United States Army Air Forces use
Ibsley was known as USAAF Station AAF-347 for security reasons by the USAAF during the war, and by which it was referred to instead of location. Its USAAF Station Code was "IB".

USAAF Station Units assigned to RAF Ibsley were:
 327th Service Group
 329th and 79th Service Squadrons; HHS 327th Service Group
 21st Weather Squadron
 32nd Mobile Reclamation and Repair Squadron
 3rd Radio Squadron
 40th Mobile Communications Squadron
 83rd Airdrome Squadron
 98th Station Complement Squadron
 Headquarters & Headquarters Squadron (70th Fighter Wing)
Regular Army Station Units included:
 555th Signal Aircraft Warning Battalion
 692nd Quartermaster Battalion
 926th Signal Battalion
 1113th Signal Company
 1180th Quartermaster Company
 1292nd Military Police Company
 1829th Ordnance Supply & Maintenance Company
 2200th Quartermaster Truck Company
 332nd Signal Company
 807th Chemical Company (Air Operations)
 878th Signal Depot Company
 900th Signal Depot Company

1st Fighter Group
The first USAAF unit to use Ibsley was the Eighth Air Force 1st Fighter Group, equipped with Lockheed P-38 Lightnings. The 1st FG arrived from RAF Goxhill on 24 August 1942. Tactical squadrons of the group and squadron fuselage codes were:
 27th Fighter Squadron (HV)
 71st Fighter Squadron (LM)
 94th Fighter Squadron (UN)

The stay of the 1st FG was short, being assigned to Twelfth Air Force for duty in the Mediterranean theater in support of the Operation Torch North African landings.
 
On 16 October 1943 RAF Ibsley was allocated to the Ninth Air Force.

48th Fighter Group

With construction completed, on 29 March 1944 the Ninth Air Force 48th Fighter Group arrived at Ibsley from Waterboro AAF, South Carolina. The 48th flew the Republic P-47 Thunderbolt and had the following fighter squadrons and fuselage codes:
 492d Fighter Squadron (F4)
 493d Fighter Squadron (I7)
 494th Fighter Squadron (6M)

The 48th was a group of Ninth Air Force's 70th Fighter Wing, IX Tactical Air Command. Ibsley continued to be used by the 48th FG until 4 July when the last personnel left.

367th Fighter Group

Arriving on the heels of the departing 48th FG, the 367th Fighter Group arrived at Ibsley on 6 July 1944 from RAF Stoney Cross. The 367th flew Lockheed P-38 Lightnings. Tactical squadrons of the group and squadron fuselage codes were:
 392d Fighter Squadron (H5)
 393d Fighter Squadron (8L)
 394th Fighter Squadron (4N)

The 367th was a group of Ninth Air Force's 70th Fighter Wing, IX Tactical Air Command. The 392d and 393d and 394th Fighter Squadrons went to Carentan (ALG A-10), Cretteville (ALG A-14) and Reuxeville (ALG A-6) respectively.

Current use
Today the airfield consists mostly of a series of gravel pits and large landscaped lakes. One lake is overlooked by the derelict, windowless control tower. A very small section of the end of runway 01 still exists south of Ellingham Drive at the southern part of the airfield.

A small memorial is located near the control tower .

See also

List of former Royal Air Force stations

References

Citations

Bibliography

 Freeman, Roger A. (1994) UK Airfields of the Ninth: Then and Now 1994. After the Battle 
 Freeman, Roger A. (1996) The Ninth Air Force in Colour: UK and the Continent-World War Two. After the Battle 
 Maurer, Maurer (1983). Air Force Combat Units Of World War II. Maxwell AFB, Alabama: Office of Air Force History. .
 www.controltowers.co.uk RAF Ibsley
 British Automobile Association (AA), (1978), Complete Atlas of Britain,

External links

 Full listing of units (RAF/USAAF) at RAF Ibsley
 Ibsley Airfield photo album
 Lakenheath Airmen attend World War II ceremony 3/1/2006
 RAF Ibsley Historical Group
 RAF Ibsley Airfield Heritage Trust

Airfields of the VIII Fighter Command in the United Kingdom
Airfields of the IX Fighter Command in the United Kingdom
Military airbases established in 1941
Military installations closed in 1947
Royal Air Force stations in Hampshire
Royal Air Force stations of World War II in the United Kingdom
1941 establishments in England
1947 disestablishments in England